The 1992 World Men's Curling Championship (branded as 1992 Canada Safeway World Men's Curling Championship for sponsorship reasons) took place from March 28 – April 5, 1992, at the Olympic Eisstadion in Garmisch-Partenkirchen, Germany.

Teams

Round-robin standings

Round-robin results

Draw 1

Draw 2

Draw 3

Draw 4

Draw 5

Draw 6

Draw 7

Draw 8

Draw 9

Tiebreaker

Playoffs
Scotland skip Hammy McMillan made an incredible "around the horn" takeout in the 8th end of the semifinal against Canada to score 3 points en route to defeating the Canadians.

Bracket

Final

References

 

Canada Safeway World Mens Curling Championship, 1992
1992 in German sport
International curling competitions hosted by Germany
Sport in Garmisch-Partenkirchen
Sports competitions in Bavaria
World Men's Curling Championship
March 1992 sports events in Europe
April 1992 sports events in Europe
1990s in Bavaria